The SEAT Salsa is a concept car presented at the 2000 Geneva Motor Show, as a foretaste of SEAT's new design line under Walter de'Silva. Featuring a three-door coupé body style, it is powered by a  2.8L 24 valve V6 engine.

The SEAT Salsa was described as a Multi Driving concept car, because its driver could select through a dashboard switch several driving modes (sport, comfort, city) thus modifying not only the engine and the gearbox parameters but also the driving position, the interior lighting or even the layout of the dashboard.

Six months after the presentation of the Salsa in Geneva, SEAT revealed the SEAT Salsa Emoción at the 2000 Autosalon Paris. The Salsa Emoción is the evolution of the initial Multi Driving concept car, adding new features in terms of an all road adaptability.

On the design process of the Salsa concept, the Alias StudioTools CAID software has been used.

Engine
Type: 2.8L 24 valve V6 in 15.0°, DOHC
Displacement cu in (cc): 170.317 (2791)
Power bhp (kW) at RPM: 247 (184.2)/6200
Torque ft·lbf (Nm) at RPM: 219 (297)/3200

Brakes and tires
Brakes front/rear: vented disc/vented disc, ABS
Driveline: Four wheel drive
Tires: Michelin PAX 225-640 R 460 A Segment SPORT, 7.5J x 18 wheel

Exterior dimensions and weight
Length × Width × Height in: 163.5 × 70 × 54.4
Weight lb (kg): 3461 ( 1570 )

Performance
Acceleration 0–100 km/h s: 7.5
Top Speed mph (km/h): 152 (245)

References

External links

 http://www.caranddriver.com/news/auto_shows/2000_geneva_auto_show_auto_shows/appearing/seat_salsa_auto_shows
 http://www.channel4.com/4car/ft/feature/concept+car/1311/1
 http://www.autoexpress.co.uk/carreviews/firstdrives/29782/seat_salsa.html
 http://www.spiegel.de/auto/fahrberichte/0,1518,67256,00.html

Salsa